The Albatros D.V is a fighter aircraft built by the Albatros Flugzeugwerke and used by the Luftstreitkräfte (Imperial German Air Service) during World War I. The D.V was the final development of the Albatros D.I family and the last Albatros fighter to see operational service. Despite its well-known shortcomings and general obsolescence, approximately 900 D.V and 1,612 D.Va aircraft were built before production halted in April 1918. The D.Va continued in operational service until the end of the war.

Design and development

The resulting D.V prototype flew later that month. The D.V closely resembled the D.III and used the same 127 kW (170 hp) Mercedes D.IIIa engine. The most notable difference was a new, fully elliptical cross-section fuselage which was  lighter than the partially flat-sided fuselage of the earlier D.I through D.III designs. The new elliptical cross-section required an additional longeron on each side of the fuselage and the fin, rudder and tailplane initially remained unchanged from the D.III. The D.V also featured a larger spinner and ventral fin.

Compared to the D.III, the upper wing of the D.V was  closer to the fuselage, while the lower wings attached to the fuselage without a fairing. The D.V wings were almost identical to those of the standard D.III, which had adopted a sesquiplane wing arrangement broadly similar to the French Nieuport 11. The only significant difference between wings of the D.III and D.V was a revised routing of the aileron cables that placed them entirely within the upper wing,  conducted structural tests on the fuselage, but not the wings, of the D.V.

Early examples of the D.V featured a large headrest, usually removed in service, because it interfered with the pilot's field of view. The headrest was deleted from the second production batch. Aircraft deployed in Palestine used two wing radiators, to cope with the warmer climate.  issued production contracts for 200 D.V aircraft in April 1917, followed by additional orders of 400 in May and 300 in July. Initial production of the D.V was exclusively undertaken by the Johannisthal factory, while the Schneidemühl factory produced the D.III through the remainder of 1917.

Operational history

The D.V entered service in May 1917 and structural failures of the lower wing immediately occurred. In 2009, Guttman wrote that "Within the month  was doing belated stress testing and concluding, to its dismay, that the D.V’s sesquiplane wing layout was even more vulnerable than that of its predecessor". The outboard sections of the D.V upper wing also suffered failures, requiring additional wire bracing and the fuselage sometimes cracked during rough landings. Against these problems, the D.V offered very little improvement in performance. Front line pilots were considerably dismayed and many preferred the older D.III; Manfred von Richthofen was critical of the new aircraft. In a July 1917 letter, he described the D.V as "so obsolete and so ridiculously inferior to the English that one can't do anything with this aircraft". British tests of a captured D.V revealed that the aircraft was slow to manoeuvre, heavy on the controls and tiring to fly.

Albatros responded with the D.Va, which featured stronger wing spars, heavier wing ribs and a reinforced fuselage. The modified D.Va was  heavier than the D.III but the structural problems were not entirely cured. Use of the high-compression 130 kW (180 hp) Mercedes D.IIIaü engine offset the increased weight of the D.Va. The D.Va also reverted to the D.III aileron cable linkage, running outwards through the lower wing, then upwards to the ailerons - much the same as the earlier Albatros B.I unarmed two-seater had used before 1914 - to provide a more positive control response. The wings of the D.III and D.Va were interchangeable. To further strengthen the wing, the D.Va added a small diagonal brace connecting the forward interplane strut to the leading edge of the lower wing; the brace was also retrofitted to some D.Vs.

 placed orders for 262 D.Va aircraft in August 1917, followed by orders for another 250 in September and 550 in October. , which had been engaged in production of the D.III, received orders for 600 D.Va aircraft in October. Deliveries of the D.Va commenced in October 1917. Production of the D.Va ceased in April 1918. In May 1918, 131 D.V and 928 D.Va aircraft were in service on the Western Front; the numbers declined as the Fokker D.VII and other types replaced the Albatros in the final months of the war. By 31 August, fewer than 400 Albatros fighters of all types remained at the front but they continued in service until the Armistice.

Surviving aircraft and reproductions

Two D.Va aircraft survive in museums.
 It is believed serial D.7161/17 served with Jasta 46 before being captured sometime in April or May 1918. In 1919, the aircraft was presented to the De Young Memorial Museum in San Francisco, California. The National Air and Space Museum acquired the aircraft in 1949. It was placed in storage until restoration began in 1977. Since 1979, D.7161/17 has been on display at the Air and Space Museum, in Washington D.C.  This aircraft carries the distinctive personal marking of "Stropp" on the fuselage sides.
 Serial D.5390/17 was shot down during a fight with an Australian Flying Corps R.E.8 on 17 December 1917. It landed intact behind the lines of the 21st Infantry Battalion of the Second Australian Division, AIF. The unit recovered the aircraft and took the pilot,  Rudolf Clausz of  29, prisoner. In February 1918, the War Office ceded D.5390/17 to the AFC as a war trophy. It was eventually put on display at the Australian War Memorial. The aircraft was removed from display in 2001 and underwent extensive restoration at the Treloar Technology Centre. In 2008, D.5390/17 returned to public display at the AWM's ANZAC Hall in Canberra.

Cole Palen built a flying replica for his Old Rhinebeck Aerodrome (in Bavarian ace Hans Böhning's  colour scheme for its rear fuselage.) A Ranger-powered replica, built in Canada, now flies with the New Zealand Warbirds Association at Ardmore, Auckland. A number of authentically-constructed airworthy Albatros D.Va reproductions have been built in New Zealand with original and new-build engines. One example is on display at the Royal Air Force Museum in Colindale, London, another is owned by Kermit Weeks in Florida, USA, while two others remain flying with TVAL in NZ.

Operators

 
 

 Polish Air Force (postwar)

 Ottoman Air Force

Specifications (D.V)

See also

Notes

References

Bibliography
 Bennett, Leon. Gunning for the Red Baron. College Station, Texas: Texas A&M University Press, 2006. .
 Connors, John F. Albatros Fighters in Action (Aircraft No. 46). Carrollton, Texas: Squadron/Signal Publications, Inc., 1981. .
 Gray, Peter and Owen Thetford. German Aircraft of the First World War. London: Putnam & Company Ltd., 1970. 2nd ed. .
 Green, William and Gordon Swanborough. The Complete Book of Fighters. London: Salamander Books, 1994. .
 Grosz, Peter M. "The Agile & Aggressive Albatros". Air Enthusiast Quarterly, No. 1, n.d., pp. 36–51.  
 Grosz, Peter M. Albatros D.III (Windsock Datafile Special). Berkhamsted, Herts, UK: Albatros Publications, 2003. .
 Guttman, Jon. SE 5A vs Albatros D V: Western Front 1917-18 (Duel 20). Oxford, UK: Osprey Publishing, 2009. .
 Herris, Jack. Pfalz Aircraft of World War I (Great War Aircraft in Profile, Volume 4). Boulder, Colorado: Flying Machine Press, 2001. .
 Mikesh, Robert C. Albatros D.Va: German Fighter of World War I. Washington, D.C.: Smithsonian Institution Press, 1980. 
 Nelcarz, Bartolomiej and Robert Peczkowski. White Eagles: The Aircraft, Men and Operations of the Polish Air Force 1918–1939. Ottringham, UK: Hikoki Publications, 2001. 

 VanWyngarden, Greg. Albatros Aces of World War I Part 2 (Aircraft of the Aces No. 77). Oxford, UK: Osprey Publishing, 2007. .

External links

 Smithsonian NASM's Albatros D.Va page
 Old Rhinebeck Aerodrome's reproduction Albatros D.Va page

Single-engined tractor aircraft
Sesquiplanes
1910s German fighter aircraft
Military aircraft of World War I
D.05
Aircraft first flown in 1917